Flag of Anzoátegui may refer to:

Flag of Anzoátegui
Flag of Anzoátegui, Tolima